Vyacheslav Kulyomin (born June 14, 1990) is a Russian professional ice hockey forward who is currently an unrestricted free agent. He most recently played for HC Dynamo Moscow in the Kontinental Hockey League (KHL).

Kulyomin made his Kontinental Hockey League debut playing with HC CSKA Moscow during the inaugural 2008–09 KHL season. In 2013 he played for Torpedo Nizhny Novgorod of the KHL.

References

External links

1990 births
Living people
HC CSKA Moscow players
HC Dynamo Moscow players
Russian ice hockey forwards
People from Noginsk
Torpedo Nizhny Novgorod players
HC Vityaz players
Sportspeople from Moscow Oblast